Delia Garcia (born May 13, 1977) is an American official who formerly served as the Kansas Secretary of Labor. Garcia previously served as a Democratic member of the Kansas House of Representatives, representing the 103rd district. She served from 2005 to 2011, and was a member of the Kansas Democratic Hispanic Caucus.

Career
Garcia, who has a Bachelor's degree from Wichita State University and a Master's in political science from St. Mary's University, Texas, worked as a professor at Butler Community College, as well as an assistant manager at Connie's Mexico Cafe.

In 2010, rather than run for re-election herself, she helped longtime ally Ponka-We Victors file as the sole candidate in the Democratic primary election. (No Republican had bothered to run in the 103rd district since 1998.) Victors has held the seat ever since.

Committee membership
 Commerce and Labor
 Veterans, Military and Homeland Security
 Local Government (Ranking Member)
 Elections

Major donors
The top 5 donors to Garcia's 2008 campaign:
 Kansans for Lifesaving Cures: $750 	
 Garcia, Delia: $725 	
 Ruffin, Phil: $600 	
 The Kansas Realtor PAC: $500 	
 Comejo, Ronald J: $500

References

External links
 Project Vote Smart profile
 Kansas Votes profile
 State Surge – Legislative and voting track record
 Campaign contributions: 2004, 2006, 2008

Living people
St. Mary's University, Texas alumni
Wichita State University alumni
Democratic Party members of the Kansas House of Representatives
Women state legislators in Kansas
Butler Community College
1977 births
21st-century American politicians
21st-century American women politicians
State cabinet secretaries of Kansas